Jonathan Walasiak (born 23 October 1982 in Mons) is a Belgian football player who has been in the national team. He last played for Royal Albert Quévy-Mons and is a right midfielder.

Career
Walasiak played professional football in Belgium and Hungary, beginning his career at Standard.

References

External links 
 
 

1982 births
Living people
Belgian footballers
Belgian people of Polish descent
Belgium international footballers
Belgian expatriate footballers
Belgian Pro League players
Ligue 1 players
Standard Liège players
FC Metz players
R.E. Mouscron players
Győri ETO FC players
Expatriate footballers in Hungary
Footballers from Hainaut (province)
Association football midfielders
Sportspeople from Mons
Belgian expatriate sportspeople in Hungary